Mount Turner is a  mountain summit located in the upper Spray River Valley of southern Banff National Park, in the Canadian Rockies of Alberta, Canada. Mount Turner in not visible from any road in Banff Park, however, it can be seen from Alberta Highway 742, also known as the Smith-Dorrien/Spray Trail in Kananaskis Country. Mount Turner's nearest higher peak is Cone Mountain,  to the north.

History

Mount Turner was named in 1918 for Sir Richard Ernest William Turner (1871–1961), a Lieutenant-general in the Canadian Army who served during the Second Boer War and the First World War, and was a recipient of the Victoria Cross. Earlier in his career, he served in the Royal Canadian Dragoons with Sir Edward Whipple Bancroft Morrison in 1900. Not coincidentally, Mount Morrison is situated two kilometres south of Mount Turner.

The mountain's name was officially adopted in 1924 by the Geographical Names Board of Canada.

Geology

Mount Turner is composed of sedimentary rock laid down during the Precambrian to Jurassic periods and was later pushed east and over the top of younger rock during the Laramide orogeny.

Climate

Based on the Köppen climate classification, Mount Turner is located in a subarctic climate zone with cold, snowy winters, and mild summers. Temperatures can drop below −20 °C with wind chill factors below −30 °C. In terms of favorable weather, June through September are the best months to climb. Precipitation runoff from the mountain drains into Owl Creek and Bryant Creek, which empty into Spray Lakes Reservoir.

Gallery

See also
 Geography of Alberta

References

External links
 National Park Service web site: Banff National Park
 Weather forecast: Mount Turner

Turner
Turner
Turner
Turner